The 2010 Quebec Scotties Tournament of Hearts was held January 4-10, 2010 at the Montreal West Curling Club in Montreal West. The winner represents team Quebec at the 2010 Scotties Tournament of Hearts in Sault Ste. Marie, Ontario

Teams

Standings

Results

Draw 1
January 4, 9:00 AM

Draw 2
January 4, 2:00 PM

Draw 3
January 4, 7:00 PM

Draw 4
January 5, 9:00 AM

Draw 5
January 5, 2:00 PM

Draw 6
January 5, 7:00 PM

Draw 7
January 6, 9:00 AM

Draw 8
January 6, 2:00 PM

Draw 9
January 6, 7:00 PM

Draw 10
January 7, 9:00 AM

Draw 11
January 7, 2:00 PM

Draw 12
January 7, 7:00 PM

Draw 13
January 8, 9:00 AM

Draw 14
January 8, 2:00 PM

Playoffs

1 vs. 2
January 9, 2:00 PM

3 vs. 4
January 9, 2:00 PM

Semifinal
January 9, 7:00 PM

Final
January 10, 1:30 PM

References

External links
Official site

Quebec
Scotties Tournament of Hearts
Quebec Scotties Tournament of Hearts
Curling in Quebec